Crassispira erebus is a species of sea snail, a marine gastropod mollusk in the family Pseudomelatomidae.

Description
The length of the shell attains 24 mm, its diameter 9 mm.

Distribution
This marine species occurs in the Pacific Ocean from Southern Mexico to Nicaragua

References

External links
 
 Gastropods.com: Crassispira erebus

erebus
Gastropods described in 1932